Ellis County is a county located in the U.S. state of Texas. As of 2020, its population was estimated to be 192,455. The county seat is Waxahachie. The county was founded in 1849 and organized the next year. It is named for Richard Ellis, president of the convention that produced the Texas Declaration of Independence. Ellis County is included in the Dallas–Fort Worth–Arlington metropolitan statistical area.

Geography

Lake Waxahachie is located about five miles south of Waxahachie in Ellis County, Texas. Owned and operated by Ellis County Water Control and Improvement District Number One on behalf of the city of Waxahachie, the lake was formed by impounding the Waxahachie Creek in 1956. The water covers about 650 acres and has a maximum depth around 50. The former community of South Prong was located beside the creek before the lake was created. There has been a country club and a two-acre public park with boat ramp since the lake was completed. The lake is a recreational resource for the entire county.

Major highways
  Interstate 35E
  Interstate 45
  U.S. Route 67
  U.S. 77
  U.S. 287
  State Highway 34
  State Highway 342

Adjacent counties
 Dallas County (north)
 Kaufman County (northeast)
 Henderson County (east)
 Navarro County (southeast)
 Hill County (southwest)
 Johnson County (west)
 Tarrant County (northwest)

Communities

Cities (multiple counties)
 Cedar Hill (mostly in Dallas County)
 Ferris (small part in Dallas County)
 Glenn Heights (partly in Dallas County)
 Grand Prairie (mostly in Dallas and Tarrant Counties)
 Mansfield (mostly in Tarrant County and a small part in Johnson County)
 Ovilla (small part in Dallas County)

Cities

 Bardwell
 Ennis
 Maypearl
 Midlothian
 Oak Leaf
 Pecan Hill
 Red Oak
 Waxahachie (county seat)

Towns

 Alma
 Garrett
 Italy
 Milford
 Palmer
 Venus (mostly in Johnson County)

Census-designated place
 Bristol

Unincorporated communities

 Auburn
 Avalon
 Crisp
 Forreston
 Ike
 India
 Rankin
 Rockett
 Telico
 Trumbull

Demographics

Note: the US Census treats Hispanic/Latino as an ethnic category. This table excludes Latinos from the racial categories and assigns them to a separate category. Hispanics/Latinos can be of any race.

According to the census of 2000, 111,360 people, 37,020 households, and 29,653 families resided in the county. The population density was 118 people per square mile (46/km2). The 39,071 housing units averaged 42 per square mile (16/km2). The racial makeup of the county was 80.63% White, 8.64% African American, 0.59% Native American, 0.35% Asian, 7.92% from other races, and 1.86% from two or more races. About 18.42% of the population was Hispanic or Latinos of any race. By 2020, its population increased to 192,455. The racial makeup in 2020 was 55.34% non-Hispanic white, 12.33% African American, 0.37% Native American, 0.79% Asian American, 0.41% some other race, 3.62% multiracial, and 27.04% Hispanic or Latino of any race.

A Williams Institute analysis of 2010 census data found about 3.2 same-sex couples per 1,000 households were in the county.

Politics
Ellis is a staunchly Republican county in presidential elections. The last Democratic presidential candidate to carry the county was Jimmy Carter in 1976, and since 2000, Republican presidential candidates have won with more than 66% of the vote.

Law enforcement
The Ellis County Sheriff's Office provides law enforcement services to the county. The current sheriff is Brad Norman. The agency also operates the Ellis County Jail in Waxahachie.

Media
Ellis County is part of the Dallas/Fort Worth television media market in North Texas. Stations in the market are KDFW-TV, KXAS-TV, WFAA-TV, KTVT-TV, KERA-TV, KTXA-TV, KDFI-TV, KDAF-TV, KFWD-TV, and KDTX-TV.

The county is home to one local radio station KBEC 1390 AM and 99.1 FM. The station has been in continuous operation since 1955 and is the oldest Family owned radio station in Texas. A weekly newspaper, the Ellis County Press, is based in Ferris and published Thursdays. The Waxahachie Daily Light and Waxahachie Sun are published biweekly; other weekly newspapers are The Ennis News and Midlothian Mirror.

Education
School districts include:
 Avalon Independent School District
 Ennis Independent School District
 Ferris Independent School District
 Frost Independent School District
 Italy Independent School District
 Maypearl Independent School District
 Midlothian Independent School District
 Milford Independent School District
 Palmer Independent School District
 Red Oak Independent School District
 Waxahachie Independent School District

It is in the service area of Navarro College.

Notable people
 Clyde Barrow of Bonnie and Clyde
 J. D. Grey, clergyman, pastor of Tabernacle Baptist Church in Ennis, 1931–1934; later president of the Southern Baptist Convention
 Ernest Tubb, country singer and songwriter
 Donnie Fleeman professional light-heavyweight boxer, only Ellis County native to fight 3 world champion heavyweights; Sonny Liston, Ezzard Charles, and Muhammad Ali (formerly Cassius Clay).  47 national/international fights in his professional career. 37 wins, 22 KOs. Won State Heavyweight Title (Golden Gloves) in 1953 - contender for National Heavyweight Title, but lost to Sonny Liston.  Cassius Clay (Muhammad Ali) was Fleeman's last professional fight, and took place in Miami, Florida, in 1961.  This was Clay's 5th professional fight. 
 Lecil Travis Martin, known more commonly as Boxcar Willie, country singer and songwriter

See also

 List of museums in North Texas
 National Register of Historic Places listings in Ellis County, Texas
 Recorded Texas Historic Landmarks in Ellis County

References

External links
 Ellis County government's website
 
 Memorial and biographical history of Ellis county, Texas ..., published 1892, hosted by the Portal to Texas History
 The Texas spirit of '17: a pictorial and biographical record of the gallant and courageous men from Ellis County who served in the Great War, hosted by the Portal to Texas History

 
Dallas–Fort Worth metroplex
1850 establishments in Texas
Populated places established in 1850